Big Bogue is a stream in the U.S. state of Mississippi.

Big Bogue is a name derived from the Choctaw language meaning "big creek". Variant names are "Batupan Bogue", "Big Bogue Creek", and "Bogue Creek".

References

Rivers of Mississippi
Rivers of Grenada County, Mississippi
Rivers of Montgomery County, Mississippi
Mississippi placenames of Native American origin